Darla Dee Moore (born August 1, 1954) is an American investor and philanthropist. She is the former president and a partner of the private investment firm Rainwater Inc. and was married to Richard Rainwater, who founded the firm.

Early life and education
Moore was born in Lake City, South Carolina, to Eugene and Loraine Moore. She was one of two daughters and was born on a farm that produced cotton, soybean, and tobacco. Her father was a schoolteacher and coach and her mother worked at the Methodist Church. In 1972, Moore completed her high school education from Lake City High school. She graduated at the University of South Carolina in 1975 with a BA in political science.

Career

Early career
Moore started her career in 1976, working for the Republican National Committee in Washington, D.C., but decided that politics was not the field she wanted to pursue. In 1981, Moore then received an MBA from George Washington University, three years after graduating from the University of South Carolina, and joined the training program at the Chemical Bank. She eventually served as vice-chair and subsequently as the bank's managing director.

During the 1980s, Moore made a name for herself while providing debtor-in-possession financing for companies going through the bankruptcy process, specializing in bankruptcy takeovers for the company. In 1996, after running the company that he founded into deep financial trouble, T. Boone Pickens was removed by Moore as the head of Mesa Inc, which mainly dealt with the production of oil and natural gas. Once in control, she then proceeded to make a profit off the company after investing a total of 66 million dollars.

Moore was recognized in several media outlets including Forbes, Fortune, Working Woman, Worth, The Wall Street Journal, and CNN. Her cover on Fortune magazine called her "The Toughest Babe in Business". She is credited with dismissing future Florida Governor Rick Scott from Columbia/HCA when a Medicare-related scandal broke.

Later career (Rainwater, Inc.)
In 1998, Moore took charge of Rainwater, Inc. She served as vice president during the early stages of her marriage to Rainwater and was named president of the company in 1993. A 1997 article in CNN Money by Patricia Sellers states: "To get a picture of Darla Moore, imagine, say, a cross between the Terminator and Kim Basinger, with a wicked South Carolina drawl. Upon first meeting, she can come across as a prima donna, tough and aloof. As she warms up she can turn fun and flirty, even girlish, though the shift is deceptive." Moore served as vice president of Rainwater Inc. until 2012.

Foundations 
Moore started the Darla Moore Foundation and Charleston Parks Conservancy.

Additional affiliations and memberships 
Moore has served on the boards of various organizations, including:

 Hospital Organization of America
 Martha Stewart Living Omnimedia
 South Financial Group
 The University of South Carolina
 MPS Group
National Advisory Board of JP Morgan
Vice Chair on the Board of Trustees New York University School of Medicine
Teach for America

She currently serves on the following boards:

Culture Shed

Philanthropy
Moore has given many gifts to institutions that benefit the public. Most notable are her donations to her alma mater, the University of South Carolina, which combined constitute nearly a record-breaking amount for a private donation to a business school. Some of her gifts are:
1998 — $25 million to the business school at the University of South Carolina, which renamed it the Moore School of Business; In addition to the Moore School of Business at the University of South Carolina, Moore also has a summer business program and camp called the Wachovia Scholars Business for high school students to attend.
2002 — Founded the Palmetto Institute, an independent non-profit organization focused on increasing the wealth of every person in South Carolina.
2003 — $10 million to the School of Education at Clemson University; the university has renamed the school the Eugene T. Moore School of Education in honor of her father, a Clemson alumnus and former teacher, coach, and principal in Lake City; Darla Moore's gift to Clemson's education program and the legacy of her father pushed for the start of a Creative Inquiry Program at Clemson University in the fall of 2013 called the Moore Scholars Program. The purpose of this program is for education students at Clemson University to participate in case studies and research regarding underprivileged schools and students. 
2005 — an additional $45 million to the Moore School of Business.
2011 — $5 million to the McNair Center for Aerospace Innovation and Research Center at the University of South Carolina.
2012 — $1 Million to Claflin University Music Department  When giving this award, Moore stated, "This is an investment, and with investments, you not only expect a return, you do your homework up front to ensure you get a solid return. This is what I desire with my investment- the opportunity to open the door to success to as many young people as possible."
2013 — Undisclosed amount to the ArtFields Art Festival (anticipated to be an annual event celebrating artists in the Southeastern states) in her hometown of Lake City, South Carolina.

Awards and recognition 
Fortune magazine named Moore one of the 50 Most Powerful Women In Business in 1998 and 1999. Additionally in 1998, Moore was presented with the Order of the Palmetto. In 2005, Moore was named Business Leader of the Year by the South Carolina Chamber of Commerce and in 2007, she was inducted into the South Carolina Business Hall of Fame. In 1997, Moore became the first woman to be on the cover of Fortune as "The Toughest Babe In Business" and was also named one of the Top 50 Most Powerful Women in American Business by the publication.

Miscellaneous 
In 2011, Governor Nikki Haley removed Moore from the University of South Carolina board. Moore was replaced with Tommy Cofield. In response, Moore stated, "I don't need a title or position to speak out. I just need a voice, my vision and a forum to be heard…". During this time, she convinced Governor Haley and the South Carolina state legislature to match her donation of five million dollars to a new aerospace center at the University of South Carolina, which was named in honor of Dr. Ronald McNair, who died aboard the Space Shuttle Challenger mission of 1986 and was originally from the city of Lake City, South Carolina.

In 2012, Moore and former Secretary of State Condoleezza Rice became the first two female members of Augusta National Golf Club. Prior to her invitation, Moore was known to have a friendship with one of the former chairmen of Augusta, Hootie Johnson. It was her husband, Rainwater, who originally introduced Moore to the game of golf, after they first met in the early 1990s. Moore has described her excitement to join the club in a statement to The New York Times, stating:I am honored to have accepted an invitation to join Augusta National Golf Club ... Augusta National has always captured my imagination, and is one of the most magically beautiful places in the world, as everyone gets to see during the Masters each April. I am fortunate to have many friends who are members at Augusta National, so to be asked to join them as a member represents a very happy and important occasion in my life. Above all, Augusta National and the Masters tournament have always stood for excellence, and that is what is so important to me. I am extremely grateful for this privilege.

Personal life 
Moore met Richard Rainwater on a business trip to Texas. In 1991, they were married in New York City in Park Avenue's Brick Presbyterian Church. Rainwater's net worth almost tripled due to his marriage to Moore, whose net worth was estimated at $2.3 billion in 2012.

From 2001 forward Moore and Rainwater lived separately, she in South Carolina, he in Texas and California. In March 2011, a court declared him incapacitated as a result of his battle with progressive supranuclear palsy (PSP), and his youngest child, Matthew, became his legal guardian. As his illness progressed, Rainwater's primary caregiver was his brother Walter until around-the-clock nursing care became necessary. Rainwater died September 27, 2015. He was survived by his former wife, his son Todd, and two other children, Matthew and Courtney, from an earlier marriage.

Since around 2008, Moore spends most of her time in Lake City, South Carolina in a house built on a plantation that has been in the Moore family for six generations. Moore turned the farmland of her property into the Moore Farms Botanical Garden.

She also owns homes in New York City, Folsom, California, and Charleston, South Carolina. Her hobbies include being a collector, mostly of 18th-century French furniture and rare books. In addition, Moore enjoyed riding with her husband in his 1957 Chevy before his illness began.

Moore has one sister, Lisa.

References

External links
Inc. magazine profile
Portrait of Moore from a presentation at a Wharton School executive series presentation. Includes further references.
Biographical sketch from Clemson University's Eugene T. Moore School of Education.
Darla Moore | The Moore School of Business | University of South Carolina

1954 births
Living people
People from Lake City, South Carolina
American bankers
American investors
American money managers
Philanthropists from South Carolina
American women bankers
Washington, D.C., Republicans
South Carolina Republicans
American women investors
University of South Carolina alumni
George Washington University School of Business alumni
20th-century American philanthropists
20th-century American businesswomen
20th-century American businesspeople
20th-century women philanthropists